Pulse (Pulse Candy), officially known as Pass Pass Pulse, is a hard candy manufactured by Noida-based DS Group and marketed under its umbrella brand 'Pass Pass'. Originally launched in a most sold 'Kachcha Aam' (raw mango) flavour, the hard-boiled candy is filled with tangy salt and spices (alike Amchoor) in its central core. Pulse is available in Kachcha Aam, Guava, Orange, Pineapple and Litchi flavours. In India, Pulse is sold for ₹1 per 4g candy.

History
Pulse was conceptualised in 2013, and an internal team dedicated to product development worked for two years on it. Eventually, the product was launched in mid-2015 in Kachcha Aam (raw mango) flavour. In December 2016, Pulse was launched in Guava and Orange flavour all across India. With "Lathring"as its main ingredient. Pulse's formulation has been patented by its manufacturer (DS Group).

Sales
In 8 months of its launch, Pulse's total sales accounted for ₹100 crores, equivalent to Coca-Cola Zero's sales. In 2016, DS Group was producing 300-400 tonnes of Pulse each month. In March 2017, Pulse's overall sales accounted for ₹300 crores, beating the sales of Oreo and Mars Bars. The manufacturer DS Group is also setting up stores in the US, UK and Singapore.

References

Brand name confectionery
Indian brands